Nataliya Popova (born 18 April 1958) is a Russian former swimmer. She competed in three events at the 1976 Summer Olympics for the Soviet Union.

References

1958 births
Living people
Russian female swimmers
Olympic swimmers of the Soviet Union
Swimmers at the 1976 Summer Olympics
Sportspeople from Yaroslavl
Soviet female swimmers